Santy Hulst (born 27 October 1987 in Leiderdorp) is a Dutch former professional footballer who played as an attacking midfielder. He played for ADO Den Haag, FC Dordrecht, De Graafschap, and SVV Scheveningen.

External links
 Voetbal International profile 

1987 births
Living people
People from Leiderdorp
Association football midfielders
Dutch footballers
ADO Den Haag players
FC Dordrecht players
De Graafschap players
Eredivisie players
Eerste Divisie players
Derde Divisie players
Footballers from South Holland